St Timothy's Episcopal Church is an Episcopal church in Winston-Salem, North Carolina (Diocese of North Carolina) founded in 1950.

External links 
St. Timothy's Episcopal Church

Anglo-Catholic church buildings in the United States
Churches in Winston-Salem, North Carolina
Episcopal church buildings in North Carolina